Lydella is a genus of flies in the family Tachinidae.  Lydella thompsoni can be used in the UK for the biological control of the European corn borer.

Species
Lydella acellaris Chao & Shi, 198
Lydella breviseria (Pandellé, 1896)
Lydella columbina Richter, 1976
Lydella grisescens Robineau-Desvoidy, 1830
Lydella jalisco Woodley, 1994
Lydella lacustris Herting, 1959
Lydella matutina Richter, 2003
Lydella minense (Townsend, 1927)
Lydella oryzae Townsend, 1916
Lydella parasitica Mesnil, 1959
Lydella radicis (Townsend, 1916)
Lydella ripae (Brischke, 1885)
Lydella scirpophagae (Chao & Shi, 1982)
Lydella sesamiae (Mesnil, 1968)
Lydella slavonica (Zeegers, 2013)
Lydella stabulans (Meigen, 1824)
Lydella striatalis (Townsend, 1916)
Lydella thompsoni Herting, 1959

References

Diptera of Europe
Diptera of Asia
Diptera of North America
Exoristinae
Tachinidae genera
Taxa named by Jean-Baptiste Robineau-Desvoidy